Break the Chains is a work of political non-fiction written by Scottish socialist and trade unionist Richie Venton and published in 2015 by the Scottish Socialist Party.

In the book, Venton argues the case for an immediate £10 an hour minimum wage, without discrimination; a national maximum wage; a shorter working week; and strategies to "unchain the unions". It has been compared favourably to The Establishment: And How They Get Away With It by Owen Jones.

The book was launched in Bacchus Cafe Bar, Glasgow on Thursday 17 December 2015. Another launch event was announced in Dundee. The Glasgow launch was livestreamed over the Internet.

See also 
 The Case for an Independent Socialist Scotland

References 

Books about politics of the United Kingdom
Books critical of capitalism
Scottish Socialist Party
2015 non-fiction books